Belaid Abdessalam (20 July 1928 – 27 June 2020) was an Algerian politician, who served as Prime Minister from 1992 to 1993.

Biography
Abdessalam was born in Dehamcha, Sétif Province, Algeria on 20 July 1928. Abdessalam was a nationalist leader in the FLN during Algeria's struggle for independence from France. He was minister of industry and power under the military regime of Houari Boumedienne, and his name was closely connected with the former Algerian state policy of building a base of heavy industry through planned economy. Abdessalam served as Head of Government of Algeria from 8 July 1992 until 21 August 1993. He also hold the portfolio of Minister of Finance.
During his tenure, the Algerian Civil War with Islamist rebels intensified.

On 27 June 2020, he died at Ain Naadja military hospital in Algiers, aged 91.

References

1928 births
2020 deaths
People from Sétif Province
Algerian People's Party politicians
Movement for the Triumph of Democratic Liberties politicians
National Liberation Front (Algeria) politicians
Algerian nationalists
Prime Ministers of Algeria
Finance ministers of Algeria
21st-century Algerian people